Scyphocrinus, is an extinct genus of crinoids. Species belonging to this genus lived during the Silurian and Devonian periods (from 443.4 to 358.9 Ma).

The crinoid genus Camarocrinus have been considered by some authors the bulbous distal end of the stem of Scyphocrinus, having the function of a root and fixing the crinoid to the sea button.

Species
 Scyphocrinus elegans Zenker, 1833

See also
 List of prehistoric echinoderms
 Paleobiology Database
 Sepkoski, Jack phylum Echinodermata
 Stephen K. Donovan and David N. Lewis The mid-Palaeozoic camerate crinoid Scyphocrinites Zenker in southwest England

References

Silurian crinoids
Devonian crinoids